"Time Waits for No One" is a song by the English rock band the Rolling Stones from the 1974 album It's Only Rock 'n Roll. It was the first song recorded for the album.

Credited to Mick Jagger and Keith Richards, "Time Waits for No One" is a slower, smoother song than the ones for which the Stones are best known. The track features a distinctive groove that has been compared to the later song "Waiting on a Friend" (recording of which in fact started in late 1972). It is also noted for its distinct Latin influences.

The song opens with a riff by Richards which echoes throughout the rest of the song. Drummer Charlie Watts and Bill Wyman keep affected jazz beats. Song contributor Ray Cooper provides the song's distinctive driving percussions, including tambourine, maracas and a knocking beat that carries through the entire song like the sound of a ticking clock. Wyman also contributes an early use of synthesizer on a Stones track. Stones recording veteran Nicky Hopkins provides the song's swirling piano runs.

The song's most noteworthy elements, however, are Mick Taylor's extended guitar solo and Jagger's lyrics. Taylor credits inspiration for the solo to a visit to Brazil following the Stones' European Tour 1973. Taylor's solo guitar piece carries the song to its conclusion.

Jagger's lyrics are a pastiche of complex observations and reflections. He speaks in the voice of a person learning the true meaning of life, that, as the title suggests, time waits for no one:

AllMusic critic Stephen Thomas Erlewine described "Time Waits for No One" as having "aching beauty". The song, though well regarded among the Stones' canon of work, has never been performed live and has appeared on only two compilation albums.  The track appeared on the British compilation album Time Waits for No One: Anthology 1971–1977, issued in 1979. This album was available on vinyl only (CDC59107) and has never been released on CD.  Subsequently, the track was included on 1981's Sucking in the Seventies. This is a truncated version, with a running time some two minutes shorter than the original, and Taylor's solo faded out early.

The song (during the chorus) can be heard when Malcolm McDowell is time-traveling as H.G. Wells in the science-fiction thriller Time After Time.

References

The Rolling Stones songs
1974 songs
Songs written by Jagger–Richards
Song recordings produced by Jagger–Richards